Taunk also spelled Taank / Tank/ Tak is a surname found in people and diaspora of Indian sub-continent. Apart from India the usage of last name is largely in found in diaspora in USA and UK. The last name is found largely among communities of North West Indian States like Gujarat, Rajasthan, Punjab, Haryana.

People with surname
Ashk Ali Tak (born 1956), Indian politician, member of the Rajya Sabha representing Rajasthan
Suresh Tak (born 1962), Indian politician, member of the Rajasthan Legislative Assembly
Saawan Kumar Tak (born 1936), Indian film director

References

Surnames of Indian origin
Indian surnames